Mary Frances Heflin (September 20, 1920 – June 1, 1994) was an American actress.

Early years
Heflin was born in Oklahoma City, Oklahoma, the daughter of Fanny Bleecker (née Shippey) and Dr. Emmett Evan Heflin, a dentist. She was the sister of Academy Award-winning actor Van Heflin.

Stage
Heflin made her Broadway debut in her teens and was later featured in the original productions of The Skin of Our Teeth (1942), The World's Full of Girls (1943), I Remember Mama (1944), and the U.S. premiere of Bertolt Brecht's Galileo on July 30, 1947 in Los Angeles.

Other Broadway credits included The Physicists, A Streetcar Named Desire, The Tempest, Sheppey, All in Favor, and The Walrus and the Carpenter.

She starred in London's West End, in John Gielgud's UK premiere of The Glass Menagerie as Laura opposite Helen Hayes. and in touring productions, including two shows opposite Farley Granger.

Television
A life member of The Actors Studio, Heflin had varying roles on many television series in the 1950s and 1960s, including small roles on Kraft Television Theatre and The Patty Duke Show. But her most notable and enduring role was of Mona Kane Tyler, mother of Erica Kane (Susan Lucci) on the soap opera All My Children. She played the role from January 1970 until her death in June 1994.

Death
In 1992, when Heflin was first diagnosed with lung cancer, Mona was diagnosed with cancer on the show. Heflin died in New York City in 1994 of lung cancer, aged 73. In August 1994, the soap aired a special episode, showcasing the best of Heflin's performances in the form of a memorial service for Mona.

Family
Frances Heflin was married briefly to filmmaker Sidney Kaufman, and then to film composer Sol Kaplan. She and Kaplan had three children: Jonathan Kaplan, a film director; Nora Heflin, a stage and film actress (who adopted her mother's maiden name); and Mady Kaplan, a television and soap opera actress. Actress Marta Heflin was her niece.

Filmography

Radio appearances

References

External links

 
 
 

1920 births
1994 deaths
American soap opera actresses
American stage actresses
American television actresses
Deaths from lung cancer in New York (state)
Actresses from Oklahoma City
20th-century American actresses
RKO Pictures contract players